The men's double sculls competition at the 1968 Summer Olympics took place at took place at Virgilio Uribe Rowing and Canoeing Course, Mexico.

Competition format

This rowing competition consisted of three main rounds (heats, semifinals, and finals), as well as a repechage round that allowed teams that did not win their heats to advance to the semifinals. All races were 2,000 metres in distance.

 Heats: Three heats. With 13 boats entered, there were four or five boats per heat. The top three boats in each heat (total of 9 boats) advanced directly to the semifinals; all other boats (4 boats) went to the repechage.
 Repechage: One heat. There were 4 boats in the repechage. The top three boats advanced to the semifinals. The last-place boat was eliminated.
 Semifinals: Two heats. Each heat consisted of 6 boats. The top three boats in each heat advanced to the final; the other three boats in each heat were sent to a 7th–12th place classification race.
 Finals: A main final and a 7th–12th place classification race.

Results

Heats

Heat 1

Heat 2

Heat 3

Repechage

Semifinals

Semifinal 1

Semifinal 2

Finals

Classification 7–12

Final

References

Rowing at the 1968 Summer Olympics